Thomas Joseph "T. J." Bray (born June 14, 1992) is an American former professional basketball player who played seven seasons in several top professional leagues in Europe. Bray played college basketball for the Princeton Tigers.

Early life and high school
Bray grew up in New Berlin, Wisconsin and attended Catholic Memorial High School. As a senior, Bray was named Wisconsin Mr. Basketball after averaging 17.9 points, 8.4 rebounds, and 6.6 assists per game and led Catholic Memorial to the WIAA Division 2 state title, recording 20 points, 12 rebounds, five assists and six steals in the state championship game. He committed to play basketball at Princeton University, which plays in the non-scholarship Ivy League, over offers from North Dakota and Florida Gulf Coast.

College career
Bray played four seasons for the Princeton Tigers and was a starter for his final three years. He played in all 32 of Princeton's games coming off the bench as a freshman, averaging 1.5 points per game. In his first season as a starter, Bray averaged 7.2 points per game. Bray was named second team All-Ivy after averaging 9.9 points, 3.8 rebounds, 3.6 assists and 1.8 steals as a junior. As a senior, he was a unanimous first team All-Ivy selection after leading the Tigers with 18 points per game, 34 steals, 133 assists and a .537 field goal percentage. Bray finished his collegiate career with 1,024 points scored and third in school history with 374 assists.

Professional career

Pallacanestro Trapani
After going unselected in the 2014 NBA draft, Bray played in the 2014 NBA Summer League as a member of the Toronto Raptors roster. He averaged 4.4 points, 1.6 rebounds, 1.2 assists, and 18.2 minutes played over five games for the Raptors but ultimately was not invited to preseason training camp. He then signed with Pallacanestro Trapani of Serie A2 Basket, the Italian second division, on August 6, 2014. In his first professional season, Bray averaged  9.5 points, 3.0 assists, and 3.9 rebounds per game in 29 games played.

Casale Monferrato
Following the Serie A2 season, Bray played in the 2015 NBA Summer League with the New York Knicks, but only appeared in two games. Bray returned to Serie A2 for a second season after signing with Novipiù Casale Monferrato on August 4, 2015. Bray played in 35 games with Casale Monferrato, averaging 14.7 points, 3.5 rebounds and 3.1 assists per game.

Basic-Fit Brussels
Bray initially signed a contract to play for Riesen Ludwigsburg of the German Basketball Bundesliga (BBL) in the summer of 2016 but was unable to play for the team due to a knee injury he suffered while back in the U.S. After rehabbing the injury for several months, Bray signed with Basic-Fit Brussels of the Belgian Pro Basketball League (PBL) on January 10, 2017 for the remainder of the 2016–17 season. After joining the team Bray played in 33 games, all starts, and averaged 8.2 points, 2.3 rebounds, 2.1 assists and 1.2 steals per game and was named honorable mention All-PBL by Eurobasket.com.

Kolossos Rodou
Bray signed with Kolossos Rodou B.C. of the Greek Basket League (GBL) on August 3, 2017. Bray averaged 12.1 points, 3.4 rebounds, 3.4 assists and 1.1 steals in 27 GBL games (26 starts).

Rasta Vechta
Bray signed with SC Rasta Vechta of the BBL on July 14, 2018. He was named the player of the week for the 4th round of the BBL season following a 36 point, three rebound, eight assist performance in a 106-100 win over Mitteldeutscher BC. Bray was selected as a reserve to play in the 2019 BBL All-Star Game as a member of the "International" team. Bray averaged 14.8 points, 3.2 rebounds, a BBL-leading 7.7 assists, and 1.2 steals per game in 33 games (all starts) as Rasta Vechta finished in fourth place in the BBL regular season and 19.7 points, 9.1 assists and 4.9 rebounds and 2.3 steals in the postseason. He was named first team All-Basketball Bundesliga and finished second to Will Cummings in MVP voting.

Bayern Munich
Bray agreed to a two year contract with Bayern Munich on July 11, 2019. Bray missed the first three months of the season due to a tendon injury in his foot. In 10 Euroleague games, he averaged 6.4 points, 1.7 rebounds and 2.7 assists per game. Bray re-signed with the team on August 13, 2020.

Casademont Zaragoza
On December 3, 2020, Bray signed with Casademont Zaragoza of the Liga ACB.

Panathinaikos
On February 8, 2021, Bray signed a two-and-a-half year contract with Panathinaikos of the Greek Basket League and the EuroLeague, returning in Greece after his first stint with Kolossos Rodou three years earlier. In 12 league games, he averaged 10.8 points, 3 assists and 1.7 rebounds, shooting with 53.3% from beyond the arc, 63.2% from the field and 66.7% from the free throw line. On August 15, 2021, Bray officially parted ways with the Greek club, citing serious personal reasons overseas. He announced his retirement from professional basketball on September 9.

References

External links
Princeton Tigers bio
RealGM Profile 
EuroBasket profile

1992 births
Living people
American expatriate basketball people in Belgium
American expatriate basketball people in Germany
American expatriate basketball people in Greece
American expatriate basketball people in Italy
American expatriate basketball people in Spain
A.S. Junior Pallacanestro Casale players
Basket Zaragoza players
Basketball players from Wisconsin
Brussels Basketball players
FC Bayern Munich basketball players
Kolossos Rodou B.C. players
Liga ACB players
Pallacanestro Trapani players
Panathinaikos B.C. players
People from New Berlin, Wisconsin
Point guards
Princeton Tigers men's basketball players
SC Rasta Vechta players
Shooting guards
Sportspeople from the Milwaukee metropolitan area